Wildegg railway station is a railway station in the municipality of Möriken-Wildegg, in the Swiss canton of Aargau. It is an intermediate stop on the Baden–Aarau line and is served by local and long-distance trains.

Services 
The following services stop at Wildegg:

 RegioExpress: hourly service between Olten and Wettingen.
 Aargau S-Bahn: : half-hourly service between Aarau and Turgi, with every other train continuing from Aarau to Sursee.

Until 1984, there was passenger service on the Seetal line to Lenzburg Stadt and Lenzburg railway stations.

References

External links 
 
 

Railway stations in the canton of Aargau
Swiss Federal Railways stations